Evening Peal was a notable Australian thoroughbred racehorse who won the 1956 Melbourne Cup, being ridden by George Podmore.

Having run second in the Caulfield Cup to the New Zealand champion Redcraze she was sent out a 15/1 chance. With a massive weight advantage she hung on to win the race from the fast finishing Redcraze by a half-neck.

In winning the Cup she became just the seventh mare to win the race. She carried 8 stone (approximately 51 kg) in the race, more weight than any mare had previously won with.

Her winning time of 3 minutes 19.5 seconds equalled the race record held by Comic Court.

Further reading

References

Melbourne Cup winners
1952 racehorse births
Racehorses bred in Australia
Racehorses trained in Australia
Thoroughbred family 10-d